The Daily Review Atlas, more commonly referred to by local residents as the Review Atlas, is an American daily newspaper published in Monmouth, Illinois. It is owned by Gannett.

It was formed in 1924 through the merger of The Monmouth Daily Atlas (founded ) and The Monmouth Daily Review (began daily publication in 1890). In 1987, the paper was acquired by Hollinger. Current owner GateHouse Media purchased roughly 160 daily and weekly newspapers from Hollinger in 1997.

In addition to the Review Atlas, GateHouse owns the leading paper in the Galesburg area, The Register-Mail, and several area weeklies.

They have had to close because of COVID-19 but they have plans of reopening soon

References

External links 
 

Gannett publications
Newspapers published in Illinois
Warren County, Illinois
Monmouth, Illinois
Publications established in 1890